Randall Lee Tissot (March 30, 1944 – August 15, 2013) was an American stock car racing driver from Akron, Ohio. He made 13 NASCAR Winston Cup Series starts in his career, with a best finish of 15th place at Darlington Raceway in 1973 and 1975, and at Dover International Speedway in 1975. He also made 10 starts in the Budweiser Late Model Sportsman Series in 1982 and 1983, scoring 2 top tens and a best finish of 6th at Bristol Motor Speedway.

Motorsports career results

NASCAR
(key) (Bold – Pole position awarded by qualifying time. Italics – Pole position earned by points standings or practice time. * – Most laps led.)

Winston Cup Series

Daytona 500

Budweiser Late Model Sportsman Series

References

External links
 

1944 births
2013 deaths
NASCAR drivers
Racing drivers from Ohio
Sportspeople from Akron, Ohio